Stich is a surname. Notable people with the surname include:
 Giovanni Punto, born Jan Václav Stich (1746–1803), Czech horn player and composer
 David Štich (born 1989), Czech athlete
 Michael Stich (born 1968), German professional tennis player
 Otto Stich (1927–2012), Swiss politician
 Stephen Stich (born 1943), professor of philosophy at Rutgers University

See also
 Stitch (disambiguation)

Occupational surnames